Hermine Küchenmeister-Rudersdorf (December 12, 1822February 26, 1882) was a Ukrainian composer, teacher and writer. She toured throughout Europe, then settled in America and died in Boston.

Rudersdorf's father was the violinist Joseph Rudersdorff. She studied singing in Paris with Marco Bordogni and in Milan with de Micherout (also seen as de Micheroux). She was married twice: to Dr. Kuchenmeister, a professor of mathematics, and to Maurice Mansfield, a London wine merchant. She had four children: Greta, Felix, Henry and Richard.  Richard Mansfield became a well-known actor.

Rudersdorf debuted in Leipzig, Germany, when she was the soprano soloist in Felix Mendelssohn’s cantata Lobgesang on June 25, 1840. Her English debut was on May 23, 1854, at Covent Garden's Theatre Royal on Drury Lane, where she sang in several operas. She appeared at the Royal Italian Opera in 1855.

In 1871 and 1872, Rudersdorf was engaged to sing at festivals in Boston, where she lived and taught until her death in 1882. Rudersdorf’s voice was considered very powerful, but not always beautiful. The “Rudersdorf method” she taught in her studio developed a strong head voice. Her students included Anna Drasdil, Isabel Fassett, Carlotta Patti, Mary Turner Salter, Fannie Lovering Skinner, and Emma Thursby. Teresa Carreno worked as Ruidersdorf’s studio accompanist in exchange for voice lessons.

Rudersdorf's works were published by Chappell & Co., G. D. Russell & Co., and G. Schirmer Inc. They included:

Cantata 
Fridolin (music by Alberto Randegger; libretto by Rudersdorf]

Essay 
Einige Worte uber das Erlerner des Gesanges (A Few Words about Learning to Sing)

Songs 
"Homage to Columbia"
"Maying" (text by Violet Fane)
"Rainy Day" (text by Henry Wadsworth Longfellow)
"Shadow" (text by Adelaide A. Procter)

References

Sources 
 Küchenmeister (Hermine) née Rudersdorff. In Carl Heinrich Herzel: Schlesisches Tonkünstler-Lexikon. 4 volume, Trewendt, Breslau 1846/1847, 
 Ludwig Eisenberg: Großes biographisches Lexikon der Deutschen Bühne im XIX. Jahrhundert. Paul List, Leipzig 1903, .

External links 

 
 

1822 births
1882 deaths
Voice teachers
Women composers
Ukrainian women singers